Speak John (1958–1980) was an American Thoroughbred racehorse who was the 1985 Champion broodmare sire in North America.

Background
Speak John was bred and raced by Max Gluck's Elmendorf Farm. He was trained in California under trainer Farrell Jones.

Racing career
Speak John recorded his biggest wins in the Del Mar Derby at Del Mar Racetrack in California and the Las Vegas Handicap at Bay Meadows.

Stud record
Retired to stud duty at his birthplace near Lexington, Kentucky, Speak John sired a number of good runners including multiple stakes winner Verbatim, and the 1973 American Champion Two-Year-Old Filly, Talking Picture. Belle de Jour, another daughter of Speak John, was the dam of Spend A Buck, the 1985 Kentucky Derby winner and American Horse of the Year.

In 1985, Talking Picture's daughter, Easy To Copy, won the Group 2 Premio Legnano in Milan, Italy. Her winnings, along with those of Spend A Buck, earned Speak John Leading broodmare sire in North America honors in 1985. Speak John was also the damsire of 2005 Dubai World Cup winner, Roses in May, and to Overskate, voted an unprecedented nine Sovereign Awards while racing in Canada and the United States.

Speak John died on August 9, 1980 and was buried in the Elmendorf Farm cemetery.

Pedigree

External links
 Speak John's pedigree and partial racing stats

References

1958 racehorse births
1980 racehorse deaths
Racehorses bred in Kentucky
Racehorses trained in the United States
United States Champion Thoroughbred Sires
American Champion Thoroughbred broodmare sires
Thoroughbred family 1-l
Chefs-de-Race